Percy Edward Pinkerton (19 June 1855 – 31 August 1946) was an English translator and poet. His translations included two novels by Émile Zola and a Puccini libretto.

Early life
Pinkerton was born at Stamford Hill, Middlesex, the third child of metal broker George Pinkerton (1823-1899), son of the missionary and linguist Rev. Robert Pinkerton, DD, and Mary (née Easum; 1823-1868). His siblings included the architect Godfrey Pinkerton.

Writing
Pinkerton published some volumes of poetry: Galeazzo, a Venetian Episode: with other Poems (Venice and London, 1886), which was praised by John Addington Symonds, Adriatica (1894), At Hazebro (1909), and Nerina, a lyrical drama in three acts (Cambridge, 1927). He also wrote for the Magazine of Art, and in 1889 edited Christopher Marlowe's plays. However most of his literary work consisted of English translations of European songs and literature. He was a member of the late Victorian Lutetian Society, dedicated to unexpurgated translations of the works of Émile Zola. The Society included Ernest Dowson, Havelock Ellis, Arthur Symons, Victor Plarr and Alexander Teixeira de Mattos. He translated other works from German, Italian, French and Russian.

TranslationsFrom GermanWilliam Müller, Field-Marshal Count Moltke, 1800–1878, 1879
Heinrich Düntzer, The Life of Schiller, 1883From ItalianMatteo Bandello, Novellieri Italiani. Twelve stories selected and done into English with a memoir of the author, 1892From FrenchMemoirs of Constant, the Emperor Napoleon's head valet, 1896
Émile Zola, Restless House, 1924
Émile Zola, "Pot Bouille" 1894-95 (Lutetian House, London)From RussianMikhail Artsybashev, Sanine, 1914
Mikhail Artsybashev, The Millionaire, 1915Operas and cantatas'''
Puccini, La Bohème, 1896. Performed for radio in 1930
Puccini, The witch-dancers, performed at Manchester in 1897
Niccola Spinelli, A Basso Porto, performed at Brighton in 1900
Franz Schubert, songs with pianoforte accompaniment
Ermanno Wolf-Ferrari, The New Life, 1902
Johann Sebastian Bach, Phoebus and PanHector Berlioz, Le Temple universelFrancis Poulenc

LyricsPansies'', to Salut d'Amour by Edward Elgar

Personal life
In 1909, aged 54, Pinkerton married 41-year-old Emily Harriet, spinster daughter of Rev. James Richard Woodgates, rector of Putley, Herefordshire. They lived at Red Lodge, Happisburgh, Norfolk. Pinkerton died on 31 August 1946, aged 91, at Ealing House, Porthleven, Cornwall. and was buried at Porthleven Cemetery alongside his wife. They had no issue.

References

External links

1855 births

1946 deaths
French–English translators

German–English translators
Italian–English translators
Russian–English translators
People from Porthleven
People from Stoke Newington